The 2017 Teretonga Park TRS round was the second round of the 2017 Toyota Racing Series. The event was held at Teretonga Park, in Invercargill, New Zealand from 21 to 22 January 2017.

Richard Verschoor demonstrated a consistent run of form and cruised to overall victory for the weekend, extending his championship lead over the rest of the field.

Background 
Rookie Richard Verschoor is the points leader heading into the second round of the Toyota Racing Series, in a demonstration of consistency – which he would later claim to be vital toward winning the championship. Star performances throughout the grid included Marcus Armstrong, who won on his first outing and demonstrated pace throughout the entire weekend, firming his challenge for the title in his rookie year.

Report

Practice 
The first two practice sessions were held on the Thursday and Daruvala once again proved his pace by setting the fastest time in both sessions. The beginning of Friday proved to be treacherous, with damp conditions hampering the session. Richard Verschoor was the fastest in the first free practice of Friday, with a time of 1:00.245. Conditions began to improve in the next session and local racer, Brendon Leitch was the first to break into the 53's, which saw him take the fastest time for free practice four.

Race 1

Qualifying 
Thomas Randle continued his strong form by taking pole position, with a narrow margin over Richard Verschoor. Leitch acquired third place on the grid.

Race 
After Randle initially took the win, stewards deemed him, as well as Daruvala and Hayek as to have jumped the start. Therefore, a 10-second penalty was applied to these competitors, handing the win over to Richard Verschoor.

Race 2

Race 3

Qualifying 
Local knowledge paid off as Leitch secured pole position for the feature race with tight margins between the top few cars. Randle achieved second and Daruvala was third.

Race

Championship standings 

Drivers' Championship standings

References

Teretonga Park TRS round
Teretonga Park TRS round